Ramesh Hospitals is a group of 3 tertiary care hospitals in the south Indian state Andhra Pradesh.

References

Hospitals in Andhra Pradesh
Year of establishment missing